Rudik-e Molladad (also Romanized as Rūdīk-e Mollādād; also known as Rūdi, Rūdīg, Rūdīg-e Shīrān, Rūdīg Shīrān, Rūdīk, and Rūdīk-e Shīrān) is a village in Negur Rural District, Dashtiari District, Chabahar County, Sistan and Baluchestan Province, Iran. At the 2006 census, its population was 556, in 88 families.

References 

Populated places in Chabahar County